The Kaliningrad economic region is an economic region of Russia consisting of Kaliningrad Oblast.

References

Economic regions of Russia